Djibril Diop may refer to:
 Djibril Diop Mambéty, Senegalese film director and actor
 Djibril Diop (footballer), Senegalese footballer